Daisuki was a German manga anthology for girls published by Carlsen Verlag. It was the first girl's comics (shojo manga) magazine published outside Asia. One edition was about 256 pages long and costs 5.95 Euros in Germany. The chief editor for Daisuki was Anne Berling. Due to declining sales figures, the magazine was discontinued.

Overview
Carlsen began publishing Daisuki in January 2003. The company also owned other German manga magazines, Dragon Ball and Banzai!.

See also 
 List of manga magazines published outside of Japan

References

External links
 Daisuki Official Website

2003 establishments in Germany
2012 disestablishments in Germany
Anime and manga magazines
Defunct magazines published in Germany
German-language magazines
Magazines established in 2003
Magazines disestablished in 2012
Magazines published in Hamburg
Monthly magazines published in Germany
Shōjo manga